Admiral Sir Wilmot Hawksworth Fawkes,  (22 December 1846 – 29 May 1926) was a Royal Navy officer who went on to be Commander-in-Chief, Plymouth.

Naval career
Fawkes joined the Royal Navy in 1860 and by 1867 had been promoted to lieutenant. In 1872 he matriculated at St John's College, Cambridge, but did not graduate. After a few years, he returned to England to command of the royal yacht , a post he held for two years.

Promoted to captain in 1886, he was given command of  before going on to be Naval Advisor to the Inspector General of Fortifications in 1891. On 1 January 1899, he was appointed an aide-de-camp to Queen Victoria. He was appointed in command of the new battleship  which he commissioned in December 1899 for service in the Mediterranean Fleet, but in late 1900 was back in England as Private Secretary to Lord Selborne, First Lord of the Admiralty. Promoted to rear admiral on 1 January 1901, he was invested as a Commander of the Royal Victorian Order (CVO) by King Edward VII on 11 August 1902 for his part in organizing the fleet review held at Spithead on 16 August 1902 for the coronation of the King.

The armoured cruiser  was scheduled to be his flagship for the squadron, but was first ordered to take the Colonial Secretary Joseph Chamberlain on a trip to South Africa. Fawkes hoisted his flag on the Good Hope on 23 November, and the ship left Portsmouth with Chamberlain and his wife on board two days later.

He was appointed Commander-in-Chief, Australia Station in 1905, became Commander-in-Chief, Plymouth in 1908 and retired in 1911.

Retirement
Fawkes had married Juliana Hannah Mary Spicer in 1875 and when he retired in 1911 they lived at Steel Cross, Crowborough. His wife died in 1916, and Fawkes died suddenly in 1926 at Spye Park, Chippenham when he was visiting his brother-in-law Captain Spicer.

References

|-

|-

|-

1846 births
1926 deaths
Royal Navy admirals
Knights Grand Cross of the Order of the Bath
Knights Commander of the Royal Victorian Order
People from the London Borough of Barnet
Military personnel from Hertfordshire